The women's singles tennis event at the 2015 Summer Universiade was held from July 4 to 12 at the Jawol International Tennis Court in Gwangju, South Korea.

Chang Kai-chen of Chinese Taipei won the gold medal, defeating Luksika Kumkhum of Thailand in the final, 6–1, 6–2.

Beatrice Gumulya of Indonesia and Varatchaya Wongteanchai of Thailand won the bronze medals.

Seeds
The top three seeds receive a bye into the second round.

Main draw

Finals

Top half

Section 1

Section 2

Bottom half

Section 3

Section 4

Consolation draw

Consolation finals

Top half

Bottom half

References
Main Draw

Women's Singles